TokBox was a PaaS (Platform as a Service) company that provided hosted infrastructure, APIs and tools required to deliver enterprise-grade WebRTC capabilities. It did so primarily through its proprietary OpenTok video platform for commercial application.

TokBox was founded by Serge Faguet and Ron Hose. Headquartered in the SOMA (South of Market) district in San Francisco, CA. TokBox was acquired by Telefónica Digital, a subsidiary of Telefónica, in October 2012.

Developer Resources

Server SDKs
Server SDKs: OpenTok's server SDKs wrap the OpenTok REST API, and let developers securely generate tokens for their OpenTok applications. Officially supported libraries include: Java and PHP. Community supported and created libraries include: Python, Ruby On Rails, .NET, Node.js, Perl, Golang.

Client Libraries
Client Libraries: OpenTok's WebRTC client libraries enable video communications on a client platform. Officially supported libraries include: JavaScript, iOS and Android. Community supported and created libraries include: PhoneGap and Titanium.

Developer Outreach
TokBox has a long history of active engagement with the developer community. It has sponsored numerous hackathons since 2010 such as TechCrunch Disrupt Hackathon, API Hack Day and Music Hack Day.
 
PennApps, one of the largest of such events, takes place on University of Pennsylvania campus every semester. Over a thousand students from around the world competed in the September 2013 edition of PennApps. Four sophomore students from Carnegie Mellon University with no prior hackathon experience built Classity to showcase real-time lectures on the web and won the “Best Use of TokBox API” award.

History

2007
August–Series A funding from Sequoia CapitalOctober–Launched www.tokbox.com November–Launched multi-party chat and partnership with Meebo

2008
April–TokBox Version 2 launched  July–Series B Funding from Bain Capital Ventures and Sequoia Capital September–Launched the TokBox platform/ API

2009
Added document collaboration tool—Etherpad (now owned by Google)

2010
January—rolled out its first set of paid features at $9.99 per month. 

November–Series C Funding from DAG Ventures, Bain Capital Ventures and Sequoia CapitalNovember—announced the OpenTok API

2011
February—TokBox announced that as of April 5, 2011, they will be discontinuing the TokBox video chat and video conferencing service to focus solely on their API, OpenTok.

Controversy
TokBox was the subject of controversy when 50% of their engineering staff was fired in July 2009. This happened around the time TokBox changed CEOs. The VP of Marketing is stated as saying the firings were part of the CEOs new restructuring plan. None of the original founders are currently with TokBox.

See also
 Comparison of cross-platform instant messaging clients

References

Further reading

External links
 TokBox Home Page

Teleconferencing
WebRTC
Instant messaging
Online chat
Windows instant messaging clients
MacOS instant messaging clients
AIM (software) clients
Chat websites
Web conferencing
Telefónica
Videotelephony
Yahoo! instant messaging clients